Patrick Pothuizen (born 15 May 1972) is a Dutch football manager and former player who is the head coach of Eerste Klasse club Achilles '29.

Career
Pothuizen was a defender who was born in Culemborg and made his debut in professional football, being part of the Vitesse Arnhem squad in the 1992–93 season. He also played for Dordrecht'90 and FC Twente before joining NEC Nijmegen for the second time in his career.

To date, Pothuizen owns the record of having had most yellow cards as an Eredivisie Player. His final yellow card, his 84th, is also his most notorious yellow card as critics in media claimed that it should have been a red card. In the incident Pothuizen controversially put his hand to the ball which prevented Luis Suarez from a goalscoring opportunity. After he received the yellow card, Pothuizen pulled his football shirt up in order to show the crowd his white shirt with yellow text marking saying "84", referring to his yellow card record.

After the 2009-10 season, Pothuizen ended his professional career, and joined amateur side, De Treffers.

Coaching career
In the summer 2012, Pothuizen joined DIO '30 where he was going to be a youth coach and he was also registered as a player. In addition, he would also start his own football school. On 13 June 2014 NEC announced, that Pothuizen had joined the team as a team manager for the first team. He would still continue as a youth coach at DIO '30.

Pothuizen became the assistant manager of Jong NEC for the 2016/17 season with Ron de Groot as manager. In April 2017, the duo was promoted to the first team, still with de Groot as manager and Pothuizen as his assistant. NEC announced on 2 April 2019, that he had left the club.

On 2 May 2019, he was appointed as manager of Astrantia SV for the upcoming season.

Pothuizen was appointed as head coach of Hoofdklasse club Achilles '29 in October 2021.

Honours
Twente
KNVB Cup: 2000–01

References

1972 births
Living people
People from Culemborg
Dutch footballers
SBV Vitesse players
FC Dordrecht players
NEC Nijmegen players
FC Twente players
Eredivisie players
Eerste Divisie players
De Treffers players
Association football defenders
Dutch football managers
Achilles '29 managers
NEC Nijmegen non-playing staff
Footballers from Gelderland